Zilim-Karanovo (Yeźem-Qaran) is a rural locality (a selo) and the administrative centre of Zilim-Karanovsky Selsoviet, Gafuriysky District, Bashkortostan, Russia. The population was 431 as of 2010. There are 10 streets.

Geography 
Zilim-Karanovo is located 45 km north of Krasnousolsky (the district's administrative centre) by road. Bolshoy Utyash is the nearest rural locality.

References 

Rural localities in Gafuriysky District
Ufa Governorate